The World Islamic Science & Education University (The WISE University or W.I.S.E) (Arabic جامعة العلوم الإسلامية العالمية) is an Islamic university in Amman, Jordan that was established in 2008.  It is accredited by the Jordanian Ministry of Higher Education and Scientific Research.

The university is the permanent seat of the Arabic Language and Nation Identity Conference.

Location
The WISE campus is at three locations:

 District Tariq (Tariq Hayy) Amman, for the Faculty of Dawa and Ushuluddien, Faculty of Sharia and Law, Faculty of Arabic Language and Literature.
 Umm Udzainah District (Duwar Sadis) Amman, for the Faculty of Arts and Islamic Architecture.
 Medina Riyadiyya Amman, for the main campus.

Faculties
 Faculty of Dawa and Usuluddien
 Faculty of Sheikh Noah El-Qudha for Sharia and Law
 Faculty of Arts, Humanities and Educational Science
 Faculty of Traditional Islamic Art and Architecture
 Faculty of Information Technology
 Faculty of Business and Finance
 Faculty of Basic Sciences
 Faculty of Higher Studies
 Higher Institute for Quranic Studies and Recitation

Faculty of Dawa and Usuluddien (Theology)
The Faculty of Dawa and Usuluddien has two departments:
 Department of Usuluddien (Theology), has three major studies:
 Faith and Islamic Philosophy
 Bachelor in Usuluddien (Theology)
 Master in Faith and Islamic Philosophy
 Ph.D. in Faith and Islamic Philosophy
 Quranic Sciences and Interpretation
 Master in Quranic Sciences and Interpretation
 Ph.D. in Faith and Islamic Philosophy
 Hadeeth and Its Sciences
 Master in Hadeeth and Its Sciences
 Ph.D. in Hadeeth and Its Sciences
 Department of Dawa and Islamic Studies, has two major studies:
 Dawa (Bachelor)
 Islamic Media (Bachelor)

Faculty of Sheikh Noah El-Qudha for Sharia and Law
The Faculty of Sheikh Noah El-Qudha for Sharia and Law has three departments:

 Department of Comparative Law (Bachelor, Master and Phd)
 Bachelor in Sharia and Law
 Bachelor in Law
 Ph.D. in Sharia Courts
 Ph.D. in Specific Law
 Ph.D. in Public Law
 Department of Islamic Jurisprudence
 Bachelor in Islamic Jurisprudence
 Ph.D. in Islamic Jurisprudence

Faculty of Arts, Humanities and Educational Science
The Faculty of Arts, Humanities and Educational Science has four departments:
 Department of Arabic Language and Literature
 Bachelor in Arabic Language and Literature
 Bachelor, Master and Ph.D. in Linguistic Studies
 Department of English and Literature
 Bachelor in English and Literature
 Department of Humanities
 Bachelor in Child-rearing
 Bachelor in Counseling and Mental Health
 Bachelor in Special Education
 Bachelor in Social Studies
 Master in Special Education
 Ph.D. in Special Education
 Bachelor, Master and Ph.D. in Literary and Critical Studies
 Department of Educational Sciences
 Diploma in Education
 Master in Curriculum and Teaching Methods
 Ph.D. in Curriculum and Teaching Methods

Faculty of Traditional Islamic Art and Architecture
The Faculty of Traditional Islamic Art and Architecture has three departments:
 Department of Islamic Art.
 Bachelor's and Master's Degree in Islamic Art.
 Department of Interior Design.
 Bachelor's and Master's Degree in Interior Design.
 Department of Islamic architecture.
 Bachelor in Project Management.
 Master in Islamic architecture.

Faculty of Information Technology
The Faculty of Information Technology has two departments:
 Department of Computer Scien.
 Department of information systems and networks.

The faculty include the following disciplines:
 Computer Science.
 Computer Information Systems.
 Managing Computer Networks.
 Software Engineering.

Faculty of Business and Finance
The Faculty of Business and Finance has three departments:
 Department of Economics, Finance and Banking.
 Department of Islamic Banking.
 Department of Administration.
 Department of Accounting.

The college include the following disciplines:

 Bachelor's and Doctoral Degrees in Accounting.
 Bachelor's and Ph.D. in Business Administration.
 MSc and Ph.D. in Islamic Banking
 Bachelor of Banking and Finance.
 Bachelor of Management Information Systems.
 Master's and Doctoral degree in Administration

Faculty of Basic Sciences
The college include the following disciplines (Diploma) in:
 Islamic Sciences
 Finance and Administrative
 Educational Sciences
 English
 Arabic
 Information Technology
 Islamic Art
 Interior Design

See also
  College of Islamic Studies
 College of Law and Shari'a
 College of Arabic Language and Literature

References

External links
 W.I.S.E. website

 
Educational institutions established in 2008
2008 establishments in Jordan
Islamic universities and colleges
Organisations based in Amman